Świętokrzyskie cuisine is an umbrella term for all dishes with a specific regional identity belonging to the region of Świętokrzyskie. It is a subtype of Polish and Galician cuisine with many similarities to and signs of the influence of neighbouring cuisines.

List of Świętokrzyskie dishes

Pastry and baked goods

Burocorz bogoryjski - oval, bread-like sweet bake with a hint of beet
Gryska - oval-shaped wheat bread, with a minute salty taste
Krówka opatowska (Opatów krówka) - milk condensate sweet with a minute vanilla taste; produced since the year 1980
Pączek opatowski (Opatów pączek) - yeast-cake pączek, traditionally with plum marmalade or rose filling
Piernik z żytniej mąki (piernik from rye flour) - creamy, honey and root gingerbread
Szczodroki - a yeast-cake and śmietana rogal 
Wólecka chałka pleciona - traditional chałka from Wola Wiśniowska; creamy, quadruply plaited bread roll

Soups
Fitka kazimierska - traditional soup from Kazimierza County; made from potatoes, vegetables, pork rind from fatback, barley kasza and tomato purée
Jacentowski barszcz z kapustą - traditional barszcz from Jacentów; barszcz with cabbage 
Zalewajka świętokrzyska - żurek with diced potatoes, with kiełbasa or smoked bacon, onion and pork rind

Fish dishes
Rytwiański karp w galarecie (Rytwiany carp in aspic) - Rytwiany carp prepared in aspic

Pork and beef dishes

Dzionie rakowskie - kaszanka made from pork or beef intestine, visually similar to kaszanka pâté
Kaszanka szarbianka - kaszanka with groat kasza in pork intestine
Kiełbasa łosieńska - traditional Łosień smoked kiełbasa
Kiełbasa radoszycka - traditional Radoszyce kiełbasa, with an elongated, characteristic orange colour
Kiełbasa swojska opatwowska (homemade Opatów kiełbasa) - traditional kiełbasa from Opatów; aromatic oak taste with garlic and pepper
Kiełbasa swojska wąchocka hycowana (homemade Wąchock kiełbasa) - traditional Wąchock kiełbasa, with an intense alder and birchen, heavy garlic taste 
Kiełbasa z Pacanowa - traditional kiełbasa from Pacanów; with an aromatic garlic taste
Polędwica tradycyjna z Wąchocka - traditional Wąchock sirloin

Stews, vegetable and potato dishes
Farsz z kaszy gryczanej - groat kasza stuffing, traditional stuffing from the village of Małyszyn Dolny, in the centre-north of Świętokrzyskie Voivodeship
Kugiel - noodle-like dish made from potatoes, served with meat
Prazoki - kluski-like dish made from boiled potatoes and steamed flour, served with fatback and onion
Rakowiski ziemniak pieczony - originating from the village of Dębno; sweet taste
Słupiański siekaniec dworski - rouladen dish, sliced into c. 1.5 cm wide pieces; includes gentian and groat kasza 
Żabieckie gały - small, round kluski with speck and bacon lard

See also
Lublin cuisine
Podlaskie cuisine
Świętokrzyskie Voivodeship
List of Polish dishes

References

Świętokrzyskie Voivodeship
Polish cuisine